The Jacksonville Free Press is a weekly newspaper serving the African-American community of Jacksonville, Florida. The newspaper was founded in 1986 by Rita Carter Perry, Florida's first female founding publisher.

See also

The Jacksonville Advocate

References

External links
Jacksonville Free Press official site
Jacksonville Free Press fully available full text available from the University of Florida's Digital Collections

Mass media in Jacksonville, Florida
Jacksonville Free Press
Companies based in Jacksonville, Florida
African-American newspapers
Newspapers established in 1986
1986 establishments in Florida